Hambardzum Arakelian ( Shahriar, 1865, Shusha, Russian Empire - 1918, Tbilisi) was an Armenian journalist, writer and public activist, the founder of The Relief Committee for Armenian migrants (1915) and Armenian Popular party.

Biography 
He studied in Shusha, then in Baku and Moscow, then moved to Tbilisi, where edited "Mshak" paper (succeed to Grigor Artsruni). He participated to Hague Peace Conference, marked the necessity of reforms in Armenians-inhabited territories of Ottoman Empire. An opposer of October Revolution, he was killed in 1918.

Sources
 Concise Armenian Encyclopedia, Ed. by acad. K. Khudaverdyan, Yerevan, 1990, Vol. 1, pp. 145–146.

1865 births
1918 deaths
Writers from Shusha
Armenian journalists
Armenian male writers